The Elk River file snail also known as the warty rocksnail, scientific name Lithasia lima, is a species of freshwater snail with an operculum, an aquatic gastropod mollusk in the family Pleuroceridae. This species is endemic to the United States.

References 

Molluscs of the United States
Pleuroceridae
Gastropods described in 1834
Taxa named by Timothy Abbott Conrad
Taxonomy articles created by Polbot